Heidelberg Zoo is a zoo in Germany which was founded in 1933 and opened for the public on 20 November 1934. Since 1998, the zoo director has been Klaus Wünnemann.

History 

The zoo was created as a foundation, initiated by the ornithologist, Otto Fehringer.

Fehringer was supported by Carl Bosch, the German chemist, engineer, and Nobel laureate in chemistry.

During the first years, Heidelberg Zoo was suffering from money shortage, which even worsened after 1940 and World War II.

In March 1945, the zoo was totally destroyed during bombings.

In 1972, a new director was appointed, and a reformation began.

Several new enclosures were added, like a new enclosure for sea lions 1973, Africa enclosure 1977, carnivores 1978, brown bears 1981, bird enclosure 1985, primates 1988, followed by a new tiger enclosure and other buildings.

A new elephant house was opened in 2010, where only young elephant bulls are kept, as part of the EEP breeding programme for Asian elephants.

Pictures

References 
Much of the content of this article comes from the equivalent German-language wikipedia article.  Retrieved on 14 January 2014. Some of the following references are cited by that German-language article:

External links

 Zooschool Heidelberg

Zoos in Germany
Buildings and structures in Heidelberg
Tourist attractions in Heidelberg